Joaquim Vaz Ferreira (born April 27, 1973 in Porto) is a former Portuguese rugby union footballer.

Career
The Portuguese prop played all his career for CDUP, since he was 17 years old. He is currently the most capped player from his country, having played 84 games for Portugal national team, with 3 tries scored, 15 points in aggregate, from 1993 to 2007. His first match was on April 3, 1993, in a 41-13 loss to Romania, in Lisbon.

Ferreira played in three games at the 2007 Rugby World Cup, scoring a try against Romania, in a 14-10 loss, in what would be his last competitive match. He was the captain of that same game due to Vasco Uva's absence. He retired from rugby after the tournament, aged 34. He was assistant coach to Tomaz Morais in the Portugal national team. He was nominated head coach of CDUP for the 2008/2009 season.

External links
Joaquim Ferreira International Statistics

1973 births
Living people
Portuguese rugby union players
Portuguese rugby union coaches
Rugby union props
Sportspeople from Porto
Portugal international rugby union players